Megan Keller (born May 1, 1996) is an American women's ice hockey player who competes for the US Olympic team. She was named to the roster of the United States national women's ice hockey team that competed at both the 2015 IIHF Women's World Championship and 2016 IIHF Women's World Championship.

USA Hockey career
At the 2014 IIHF Under-18 Women's World Championships, she led all skaters with a plus/minus rating of +9. To date, her best international performance came in the 2015 IIHF World Championships in Malmö, Sweden, where she contributed 5 points in 4 games as a member of the Gold-Medalist team.

On January 2, 2022, Keller was named to Team USA's roster to represent the United States at the 2022 Winter Olympics.

USA Hockey statistics

NCAA career
Keller emerged as one of the nation's best defensive players in the 2015–16 campaign.  She was a Patty Kazmaier Award top-10 finalist and named to the WHEA First-Team All-Stars, and an NCAA All-Tournament Selection.  She led all defensive players in points in the nation and broke several team and conference scoring records for defense.  She was also part of one of the best defensive units in the country, supporting 14 shutout games.

Awards and honors
All Tournament Team Selection, 2011 NAHA Tournament
2014–15 Hockey East First Team All-Star
2015–16 NCAA All American first team
2016–17 Cami Granato Award (MVP of Women's Hockey East)
2016–17 Patty Kazmaier Top-10 Finalist
2016–17 Best Defensemen, Hockey East
2016–17 WHEA First Team All-Star
2016-17 AHCA-CCM Women's University Division I All-American

References

External links

Boston College bio

1996 births
Living people
American women's ice hockey defensemen
Boston College Eagles women's ice hockey players
People from Farmington, Michigan
Ice hockey players from Michigan
Ice hockey players at the 2018 Winter Olympics
Ice hockey players at the 2022 Winter Olympics
Medalists at the 2018 Winter Olympics
Medalists at the 2022 Winter Olympics
Olympic gold medalists for the United States in ice hockey
Olympic silver medalists for the United States in ice hockey
Professional Women's Hockey Players Association players